West Adams Heights is a neighborhood in Central Los Angeles, California. It contains one Los Angeles Historic-Cultural Monument.

History
The West Adams Heights tract was laid out in 1902. The original neighborhood boundaries were Washington Boulevard on the north, La Salle Avenue on the east, Adams Boulevard on the south, and Western Avenue on the west. The development had improvements such as: 75-foot-wide boulevards,  some of the first contoured streets not to follow the city grid, lots elevated from the sidewalk and ornate street lighting. The entrances on Hobart, Harvard, and Oxford streets, south of Washington Boulevard are marked with stone pillars with the inscription “West Adams Heights.”  

Between 1938 and 1945, African-Americans moved to West Adams Heights and it became known as the Sugar Hill section of Los Angeles. Residents included Golden State Mutual Insurance Company president Norman O. Houston, actress Hattie McDaniel, civil rights activists John and Vada Sommerville, actress Louise Beavers, band leader Johnny Otis, performers Pearl Bailey and Ethel Waters.

In 1963 the Santa Monica Freeway cut through West Adams Heights and divided the neighborhood. In 2006, West Adams Heights signage was installed in the section north of the freeway. In 2012, the city named the section south of the freeway "The Sugar Hill Historic District".

Geography
In April 2006, the city instructed the Department of Transportation to install four "West Adams Heights" signs. Three are along Washington Boulevard: the southeast corner of Washington Boulevard and Western Avenue, Washington Boulevard and LaSalle Street, and the northwest corner of Washington Boulevard and Normandie Avenue. The fourth is at the intersection of Oxford Avenue and Hobart Boulevard (exiting the 10 Freeway).

Los Angeles Historic-Cultural Monuments
J.R. Dennison House - Located at 1919 South Harvard Boulevard, the J.R. Dennison House was built in 1913.  It was designated LA Historic-Cultural Monument No. 818 on July 13, 2005.

Historic Preservation Overlay Zone
West Adams Heights lies within the southern portion of the Harvard Heights Historic Preservation Overlay Zone (HPOZ).  At the HPOZ public hearing, several speakers suggested an expansion of the proposed Harvard Heights HPOZ boundaries to the south so that the entire West Adams Heights Tract could be included. The survey stated that the area developed with similar architectural designs, and within the same time frame as the proposed preservation area, but the construction of the Freeway separated the neighborhood.

Parks and recreation
West Adams Heights Park - Located at 1903 West Cordova Avenue, the park is .08 acres with a children's playground, walking path, fencing, lighting, and landscaping.  It was funded by Prop. 84 (Statewide Park Development and Community Revitalization Program) and completed on May 18, 2015.   City Council President Herb Wesson attended the 2013 groundbreaking ceremony.

References

Neighborhoods in Los Angeles
Los Angeles Historic Preservation Overlay Zones